Shashpir river is the name of one of the rivers in Fars province. The source of this river is Spring Shesh Pir, 15 km from Sepidan city.

References 

Rivers of Fars Province